James Colton (1860 – 5 August 1936), also known as Jim Colton, was a Scottish anarchist, trade unionist and coal miner. He married the anarchist activist and writer Emma Goldman in 1925, so that she could obtain British citizenship.

Biography 

Colton was born in Scotland, in 1860, the son of a stonemason. As a child, he moved to Penarth in Wales, he first worked as a baker in Upper Boat, then later moved to Glanamman in the Amman Valley, where he became a miner at the Gelliceidrim Colliery. Colton was self-educated and this led to him identifying with libertarian thought. He first met Goldman when she was giving a speaking tour in Edinburgh in 1895.

Shortly after the death of his first wife and knowing that Goldman needed British citizenship, after she had been deported from the United States in 1919, he proposed that they should marry. They married on 27 June 1925, Goldman's 58th birthday, when he was aged 65; the couple were not friends and did not intend to live together. Despite this, they occasionally maintained contact via letters. The marriage was reported in The New York Times, the following year.

After the death of Goldman's lifelong lover and friend Alexander Berkman, Colton, who was sick himself, wrote Goldman a letter expressing his sympathies.

Colton died of cancer on 5th August 1936; he was buried in the Tabernacle cemetery at Glanamman. Goldman's last letter to Colton did not reach him before his death.

References 

1860 births
1936 deaths
Burials in Wales
Deaths from cancer in Wales
Emma Goldman
Scottish anarchists
Scottish miners
Scottish trade unionists